Lorraine Gottfried (born August 16, 1937), better known by her stage name Lorraine Gary, is a retired American actress, best known for her role as Ellen Brody in the Jaws film series. She also appeared in 1941 and Car Wash.

Early life
Gary was born as Lorraine Gottfried in Forest Hills, Queens, to Belle and George Gottfried, an entertainment business manager.

At an early age, she moved with her family to Los Angeles, California, where she was raised. At age 16, she won a best actress award in a competition at the prestigious Pasadena Playhouse. She was offered a scholarship to enroll at the Pasadena Playhouse, but declined and attended Columbia University as a political science major instead.

Career
A life member of the Actors Studio, Gary began her acting career in the late 1960s doing guest appearances on several popular TV shows. These include Night Gallery, Dragnet 1968, in an episode entitled "The Big Shipment", McCloud, The Marcus-Nelson Murders (the pilot for Kojak), and The F.B.I.. She began her first major acting role when she was a guest star on seven episodes of the TV series Ironside, among them "Tom Dayton Is Loose Among Us", in which she played the substitute librarian Miss Kirk, who pushes the unstable Tom Dayton too hard, and "In Search of an Artist", as a woman with a drinking problem who may have been involved in a murder. 

In addition to her work as an actress, Gary owned New Hope Productions, a company that produced television programs.

Civic activities
Gary is a member of the Human Rights Watch Women's Rights Advisory Committee, for whom she produced and directed a series of fourteen educational videotapes, and an Advisory Board Member of Ms. Magazine and Girls Learn International.

In 1995, together with her husband, Gary received the Simon Wiesenthal Center's Humanitarian Award.

Personal life
Gary married entertainment industry executive Sidney Sheinberg on August 19, 1956, at the age of 19, with whom she has two sons named Jonathan J. and William David.

She retired from acting after her appearance in the film 1941 (1979), only briefly returning to reprise the role of Ellen Brody in Jaws: The Revenge (1987). Her sons, Bill Sheinberg and Jonathan Sheinberg, are both film producers.

Filmography

Film

Television

References

External links

1937 births
20th-century American actresses
Actresses from Los Angeles
American film actresses
American television actresses
Jewish American actresses
Living people
People from Forest Hills, Queens
Columbia University School of General Studies alumni
21st-century American Jews
21st-century American women